Nossa Senhora do Perpétuo Socorro ("Our Lady of Perpetual Help") is a bairro in the District of Sede in the municipality of Santa Maria, in the Brazilian state of Rio Grande do Sul. It is located in north Santa Maria.

Villages 
The bairro contains the following villages: Perpétuo Socorro, Vila do Carmo, Vila Getúlio Vargas, Vila Jane, Vila Neumayer, Vila Nossa Senhora do Perpétuo Socorro, Vila Tietze.

Gallery of photos

References 

Bairros of Santa Maria, Rio Grande do Sul